Tilburg University offers under the name University College Tilburg an intensive three-year program in Liberal Arts and Sciences, which combines a broad and interdisciplinary education with in-depth specialization. The distinctive focus of Tilburg University's Liberal Arts and Sciences program is on Europe in a globalizing world. Both historical and current societal key issues are tackled in the course of this international program, taught entirely in English. Students are trained to approach complex issues from different perspectives and a variety of academic disciplines. To achieve this intellectual flexibility, lectures are team-taught by lecturers from different academic backgrounds and research traditions. This method of instruction is unique to Tilburg University.

Academics
The Liberal Arts and Sciences (LAS) program is a small-scale program, characterized by a high level of student activity and interactivity. Students are expected to actively contribute to tutorials on a regular basis by debating and arguing their point of view, by presenting a research assignment or a paper they have written. In doing so, students actively train and improve their academic skills, such as scientific reasoning, critical thinking, creative problem-solving, and their presentation skills. The small class size and the interactive character of the program allow for this strong emphasis on the training of academic skills.

Curriculum
In the first year of their studies, students are offered a wide range of courses, ranging from law and literature to business and psychology. At the end of the first year students choose a Major. The five Majors are:
 Business and Management
 Law in Europe
 Social Sciences
 Humanities: European History and Culture
 Cognitive Neuroscience

Next to their Major, students choose a set of subsidiary subjects, providing them with a broad interdisciplinary perspective.

In the third year of their studies, Liberal Arts and Sciences students have the opportunity to study abroad for a semester as part of an international exchange program. Tilburg University maintains close contacts with a wide variety of highly respected universities in Europe, the United States, Canada, Australia and Japan. This international higher education and research network consists of ten universities from Europe, the United States and Asia, with outstanding academic reputations.

Students round off their Bachelor of Arts (BA)or Bachelor of Science (BSc) degree by writing an academic essay (Bachelor's Thesis). With this internationally acknowledged bachelor's degree, graduates are eligible for a master's degree. Provided they fulfil all the admission requirements, they may pursue a master's degree at Tilburg University or at another research university in the Netherlands or abroad. Starting a career in a (international) corporate or public organisation is yet another option for graduates of the Liberal Arts and Sciences program.

Campus

Studying Liberal Arts and Sciences (LAS) at Tilburg University, students do not attend a residential University College or a residential Liberal Arts College. Instead, Tilburg University has chosen to fully integrate its LAS students into Tilburg University Campus. LAS students at Tilburg University are in the privileged position of being able to benefit from both a tight community of LAS students, and mingling with all of Tilburg University's approximately 13,000 students – 1209 of whom are international students representing 85 different countries. This multi-cultural community, with all the pleasures and challenges that come with it, gives LAS students at Tilburg University the opportunity to enlarge their network and to broaden their horizon by learning from students from other study programs and nationalities.

In order to support the forming of a tight community among Tilburg University's LAS students, however, there is a lounge room reserved for LAS students only: the so-called ‘common room’.  It is the ideal place to relax, catch up with fellow LAS students or to work on a group assignment in an inspiring environment.

Student Population
Tilburg University opened its doors to the first 50 Liberal Arts and Sciences students in September 2008. One year later, in September 2009, the number of first-year students increased to 62 students. Tilburg University is striving for a maximum of 100 first-year students each year in order to maintain the small-scale groups and small-scale character of the programme.

50% of the Liberal Arts and Sciences students at Tilburg University are international. International students come from a variety of countries including Canada, the US, Austria, Belgium, China, Finland, France, Italy, Japan, Sweden, Latvia, Poland, Germany, Israel, Bulgaria, Slovakia and the United Kingdom. In addition, most of the Dutch students also have an international background. Not surprisingly, Liberal Arts and Sciences has one of the most culturally diverse student profiles at Tilburg University.

Selection of Students
Applicants for the Liberal Arts and Sciences program at Tilburg University are selected on the basis of merit, broad academic interest, and motivation. The application procedure includes the submission of a letter of motivation, an essay, the results of an English proficiency test, as well as an interview.

For the academic year 2012-2013, the application deadline for non-EU/EEA applicants requiring a visa is 1 April 2013. For non-EU/EEA applicants not requiring a visa and for EU/EEA applicants the application deadline is 1 July 2013.

Tuition Fees
The tuition fees for the academic year 2011-2012:
EEA and Swiss students €1,771
Non-EEA students  €9,100 (excluding visa costs)

At Tilburg University, Liberal Arts and Sciences students are not charged any additional institutional fees besides the tuition fees.

References

External links
 Liberal Arts and Sciences at Tilburg University

Liberal arts colleges at universities in the Netherlands
Educational institutions established in 1999
Tilburg University
1999 establishments in the Netherlands